André Kuhn (born 8 February 1961) is a Swiss fencer. He competed in the épée events at the 1988 and 1992 Summer Olympics.

References

External links
 

1961 births
Living people
Swiss male épée fencers
Olympic fencers of Switzerland
Fencers at the 1988 Summer Olympics
Fencers at the 1992 Summer Olympics